The 2016 Arab Junior Athletics Championships was the seventeenth edition of the international athletics competition for under-20 athletes from Arab countries. It took place between 5–8 May at the Lalla-Setti Athletics Stadium in Tlemcen, Algeria. It was the first time that Algeria hosted the event. A total of 44 athletics events were contested, 22 for men and 22 for women.

Around 800 athletes from 20 countries were expected to appear at the competition, though only 232 athletes from 15 nations ultimately did so.

Bahrain took the most gold medals with 16 while Tunisia won the next highest with 9. The host nation Algeria took the most medals with a total of 39, seven of them gold.

Medal summary

Men

Women

Medal table

References

Results
17th Arab Junior Championships Results . riyadapress. Retrieved on 2016-07-04.

Arab Junior Athletics Championships
International athletics competitions hosted by Algeria
Tlemcen Province
Arab Junior Athletics Championships
Arab Junior Athletics Championships
2016 in youth sport